The 2009–10 Mestis season was the 10th season of the Mestis, the second level of ice hockey in Finland. 12 teams participated in the league, and Jokipojat won the championship.

Standings

Playoffs

Qualification

Due to the fact that RoKi and Kiekko-Laser were tied at points they faced for a decider in the home arena of RoKi due to RoKi having a better goal difference. Kiekko-Laser won the game 4-2 and RoKi was relegated.

External links
 Season on hockeyarchives.info

Fin
2009–10 in Finnish ice hockey
Mestis seasons